Templin Morris Potts (November 1, 1855 – March 22, 1927) was a United States Navy Captain and the 11th Naval Governor of Guam. He held many important posts during his time in the Navy, including Director of the Office of Naval Intelligence, Naval attaché to Kaiser Wilhelm II, and aid for naval personnel. During the Spanish–American War, he participated in the Battle of Santiago de Cuba, after which he commanded a number of ships. In 1913, he was forced into retirement after not having spent a large enough portion of his service at sea. This forced retirement sparked outrage from many, and led to letters and marches of protest. A United States Senator even introduced a bill in Congress to have him re-instated. Though these efforts all ultimately failed, they led to greater scrutiny of the retirement board. As governor, he forbade the men under his command to marry native Chamorro women and increased funding to fight disease on Guam.

Early life
Potts was born on November 1, 1855 in Washington, D.C. Potts' father was John F. C. Potts. Potts mother was Louisa Elizabeth (nee Rose) Potts. Potts received his education in the Washington area private school system.

Education 
On June 20, 1876, Potts graduated from the United States Naval Academy.

Career

Naval 
In 1877, Potts served aboard  as a midshipman. During the Spanish–American War, he served aboard , where he participated in the Battle of Santiago de Cuba.

On October 1, 1902, as lieutenant commander, Potts served as Naval attaché to Rome, Italy, Vienna, Austria, and Berlin, Germany, until December 30, 1904.

That same year, he obtained the rank of Captain.

On December 17, 1909, Potts became the Director of the Office of Naval Intelligence, until January 25, 1912.

In 1911, he acted as the official United States representative for the reception of Japanese Admiral Tōgō Heihachirō. Soon after, he became Navy aid for personnel.

On May 3, 1913, Potts commanded , until July 2, 1913. After this command, Potts was forced into retirement. The Captain had passed his examination for rear admiral, but had been let go nonetheless, as he had not spent at least half of his time as captain at sea. His case drew national attention after he saved Louisiana from flooding following a valve blowout in the ship's starboard engine room that left a hole in the ship's hull. He consulted his lawyers about the possibility of reinstatement, and a group of sailors protested the forced retirement through demonstrations and letter-writing, and a Senator even introduced a bill in Congress to reinstate him with the rank of Rear Admiral. Despite the criticism, the Navy did not reinstate him.

Governorship 
Potts served as Governor of Guam from December 3, 1906 to October 3, 1907. Potts sought to separate whites from the native Chamorro population by denouncing interracial marriage, calling it "degenerating to the whites", and threatened to forcibly discharge any military man who married a native Guamanian woman. He successfully obtained additional funding from Congress  to combat outbreaks of leprosy and yaws on the island.

Personal life 
On February 6, 1883, Potts married Anna Powers Cash. They had a son, Templin Morris Powers Potts. On May 10, 1902, Potts married Mrs. Marie Alden Brown (nee Charlier) (maiden), in a civil ceremony, in Berlin, Germany.

On November 21, 1918, Potts' wife, Marie Charlier Potts (died 1937), became a ship sponsor of USS Farragut (DD-300).

On March 22, 1927, Potts died in Pasadena, California. Potts is interred at Arlington National Cemetery in Arlington County, Virginia.

References

1855 births
1927 deaths
Governors of Guam
People from Washington, D.C.
United States Naval Academy alumni
United States Navy personnel of the Spanish–American War
Burials at Arlington National Cemetery
Directors of the Office of Naval Intelligence
American expatriates in Germany